The Grainger Industrial Supply 225K was a NASCAR Craftsman Truck Series race held at Portland International Raceway on June 18, 1999. The race was the 11th race of the 1999 Craftsman Truck series, and the first time NASCAR visited the track  .

Driver Boris Said in car n°44 qualified for pole position and led the race until lap 6, and fought car n°87 Ron Fellows for the first place until lap 23, where Grainger-sponsored driver Greg Biffle took the lead. Biffle finished in 1 hour, 59 minutes and 43 seconds to claim his second of 9 season wins.

Due to technical problems leading to an undesirable finish, points leader Jack Sprague saw his lead diminish by 16 points. Sprague would ultimately end up winning the season.

Race results 

Read (R) for Rookie in the table above

References 

NASCAR Truck Series races
Events in Portland, Oregon